The River Shiel (Scottish Gaelic: Abhainn Seile) is a four kilometre long river in Acharacle, Highland. It flows out of the Loch Shiel into the sea at Dorlin.

Fishing 
The river contains salmon and sea trout, as well as native resident brown trout weighing up to 6 pounds.

References 
http://www.scotsman.com/fishfarmingindustry/The-15000-that-got-away.3470344.jp

External links

Shiel